Cagney is an Irish patronymic surname of Gaelic origin. In Gaelic, the name is Ó Caingne, and means "grandson of advocate", from caingean "legal dispute."<ref>[https://www.irishtimes.com/ancestor/surname/ Irish Ancestors / Surnames], IrishTimes.com</ref>

In modern times, it can be a male or female given name.

People
 James Cagney (1899–1986), Academy Award-winning actor
 Jeanne Cagney (1919–1984), his sister and actress
 William Cagney (1905–1988), his brother and an American film producer and actor
 Mark Cagney (born 1956), Irish breakfast television broadcaster

Other uses
 6377 Cagney, a main-belt asteroid
 Cagney & Lacey, 1980s American police detective drama series
Christine Cagney, one of the two titular characters in said series
 Cagney Carnation, a flower boss from Cuphead''
Cagney Jeffords, a minor character in American police comedy series Brooklyn Nine-Nine

See also
 Cagny (disambiguation)

Notes

Surnames
Anglicised Irish-language surnames
Surnames of Irish origin